Sir Frederick Carl Bovenschen, KCB, KBE (26 March 1884 – 9 November 1977) was a British civil servant. He was (with Sir Eric Speed) Joint Permanent Under-Secretary of State for War from 1942 to 1945.

References 

 https://www.oxforddnb.com/view/10.1093/ref:odnb/9780198614128.001.0001/odnb-9780198614128-e-30837

1884 births
1977 deaths
Knights Commander of the Order of the Bath
Knights Commander of the Order of the British Empire
People educated at The King's School, Canterbury
Alumni of Corpus Christi College, Oxford
Private secretaries in the British Civil Service
Civil servants in the War Office
Permanent Under-Secretaries of State for War
Chevaliers of the Légion d'honneur